The Ted Reeve Community Arena is a multi-purpose arena that is located on 175 Main Street and Gerrard Street East in Toronto, Ontario, Canada. The building was opened in 1954 and named in commemoration to Canadian athlete Ted Reeve.

The arena was also used for interior shots as the home of the fictional "Hamilton Mustangs" in the 1986 movie Youngblood starring Rob Lowe and Patrick Swayze.

In 2003, the Arena expanded to include a second skating rink adjacent to the building, a vinyl covered dome colloquially known as The Bubble.

References

External links
 

1954 establishments in Ontario
Ice hockey venues in Toronto